Lihue Airport  is a state-owned public-use airport located in the Līhue CDP on the southeast coast of the island of Kauai in Kauai County, Hawaii, United States, two nautical miles east of the center of the CDP.

The airport does not serve as a hub for any airline carrier. Numerous inter-island flights are available daily. American Airlines flies the A321neo to Phoenix and Los Angeles. United Airlines and Delta Air Lines operate a mixture of Boeing 737s and Boeing 757s between Lihue and their mainland destinations. Alaska Airlines and WestJet operate Boeing 737-800s between Lihue and their mainland destinations; while Hawaiian Airlines uses A321neo and Boeing 717s for its inter-island routes to Honolulu, Kahului and Kona. Southwest Airlines uses Boeing 737-800 for its inter-island service to Honolulu as well as mainland flights to Los Angeles and Oakland. Along with its inter-island service, Hawaiian Airlines serves Lihue Airport with the A321neo to Los Angeles and to Oakland.

The airport is mostly un-walled and open-air, and the check-in is completely outside. The airport is the primary gateway to Kauai for visitors (especially tourists), and has several rental car facilities. Five motion pictures have filmed scenes at the Lihue Airport: Blue Hawaii, Honeymoon in Vegas, Six Days Seven Nights, Soul Surfer, and The Descendants.

It is included in the Federal Aviation Administration (FAA) National Plan of Integrated Airport Systems for 2017–2021, in which it is categorized as a small-hub primary commercial service facility.

Facilities and aircraft

For the 12-month period ending on December 31, 2017, the airport had 129,572 aircraft operations, an average of 355 per day: 60% air taxi, 22% scheduled commercial, 16% general aviation and 2% military. At that time there were 46 aircraft based at this airport: 41% single-engine, 11% multi-engine and 48% helicopter.

On a typical day, certain gates are used for certain airlines to arrive in and depart out of the Lihue Airport. Gates 9-10 are mostly used by United Airlines, flying Boeing 737-800 and Boeing 737-900ER aircraft along with occasionally using the Boeing 757-200. Alaska Airlines occasionally uses Gate 9 as well. Gates 7-8 are mostly used by Delta Air Lines, Alaska Airlines, Southwest Airlines and WestJet. Hawaiian Airlines uses both Boeing 717 and Airbus A321 aircraft for gates 3-4, and 5-6 for their inter-island and US mainland flights, according to the airline staff. American Airlines mostly uses Gate 3 and occasionally Gate 4, using the Airbus A321 and Boeing 757-200 to fly in and out of Lihue. All gate areas are air-conditioned.

Hawaiian Airlines operates one Premier Lounge at the airport, open to first class travelers.

Airlines and destinations

Statistics

Passenger numbers

Top domestic destinations

Airline market share

Public transport
The Kauai Bus route 100/200 connects the airport to downtown Lihue.

References

External links
 Lihue Airport at Hawaii Department of Transportation
 
 
 
 

Airports in Hawaii
Transportation in Kauai County, Hawaii
Buildings and structures in Kauai County, Hawaii